Himshikhar English Boarding School is a private boarding school located at Kalanki, Kathmandu, Nepal.

See also
 List of schools in Nepal
 School Leaving Certificate (Nepal)

References

Schools in Nepal
Education in Kavrepalanchok District

Boarding schools in Nepal